Plagiolepis grassei is a species of ant in genus Plagiolepis. It is native to France.

References

Hymenoptera of Europe
Formicinae
Insects described in 1956
Taxonomy articles created by Polbot